William Barnes, Barne, Barneis or Berners (by 1502–58), of Thoby, Essex, was an English politician.

Family
Barnes had four sons, including the MP for Wigan, William Barnes, and one daughter.

Career
He was a Member (MP) of the Parliament of England for Marlborough in 1542, Taunton in April 1554, Downton in November 1554 and East Grinstead in 1555.

References

Year of birth missing
1558 deaths
Politicians from Essex
English MPs 1542–1544
English MPs 1554
English MPs 1554–1555
English MPs 1555